The 2021–22 Swedish Basketball League season is the 21st season of the Swedish Basketball League (SBL), the top tier basketball league in Sweden. Luleå Basket are the defending champions.

Teams

League table

References 

Swedish_Basketball_League_season_(Women)